KTAR-FM (92.3 MHz) is a commercial radio station licensed to Glendale, Arizona, and serving the Phoenix metropolitan area. It is owned by Salt Lake City–based Bonneville International, a profit-making division of the Church of Jesus Christ of Latter-day Saints. KTAR-FM broadcasts a talk radio format. Its studios and offices are on North 16th Street near Piestewa Peak while the transmitter is in South Mountain Park. In addition to a standard analog transmission, KTAR-FM broadcasts in HD Radio and is available online; its HD2 digital subchannel carries the Latter-day Saints Channel.

History

KXTC
On December 19, 1970, the station first signed on as KXTC, owned by the Arizona Communications Corporation. It aired a mix of mainstream and contemporary jazz music, and was an affiliate of the ABC-FM Radio Network. It initially broadcast from a transmitter atop the Westward Ho.

In 1978, with disco music gaining in popularity, KXTC switched to an all-disco format, using the name "Disco 92". Disc jockeys included Scott Tuchman and Rick Nuhn. After a couple of years, however, the disco craze faded.

KJJJ-FM and KEZC
The station dropped disco for country music in 1980, going by the moniker "KC-92". In January 1981, the station's studios moved to Shaw Butte, and three months later, the station switched its call sign to KJJJ-FM for the first time.

In 1982, the call letters switched to KEZC, which stood for EZ Country. Easy Country played the softer hits from current and recent country music charts, designed for office listening and relaxing. In 1984, the station began to simulcast with KJJJ (now KGME). It returned to the call sign KJJJ-FM, moving back to mainstream country music.

KKFR
In 1985, KJJJ-FM flipped to KKFR as a gold-based Top 40 outlet as "The Fire Station, Arizona's 92 Fire FM", and later as "92.3 KKFR, Your Fire Station!". In 1988, KKFR began calling itself "Hot Hits 92.3", but was forced to drop that by radio consultant Mike Joseph, the owner of the "Hot Hits" slogan nationally.

Over the next few years, the station began shifting towards a Rhythmic Contemporary format. It also adopted the name "Power 92", influenced by former sister station KPWR in Los Angeles. During this time, KKFR heavily competed KZZP and KOY-FM for contemporary music listeners. In April 1991, however, KZZP flipped to Hot AC, and in September 1993, KOY-FM dropped out of the format, flipping to a short-lived "rhythm and rock" format, and then smooth jazz, leaving KKFR as the lone Top 40-oriented station in the market.

On December 16, 1993, despite high ratings as a rhythmic contemporary outlet, KKFR evolved to Mainstream Top 40, leaning slightly toward Modern Rock. However, the station's ratings slipped. From January to March 1995, the station re-added rhythmic and dance music to the playlist, which helped the station regain much of its lost audience. By 1997, KKFR began dropping the dance hits, transforming into an R&B/Hip-Hop approach. By the end of the year, the station was no longer Top 40 at all.

Chancellor Media (which later became AMFM, Inc.) purchased the station in late 1998 from its longtime owners The Broadcast Group. When Chancellor merged with Clear Channel Communications, the company had to divest the station to meet FCC ownership regulations. Emmis Communications bought the station in 2000. By this time, the station began calling itself "Power 92.3".

KTAR-FM

In 2006, Emmis sold the station to Bonneville International. In turn, Bonneville announced it would move the news/talk format airing on KTAR (620 AM) to KKFR beginning September 18, 2006. That same day, KKFR became KTAR-FM. The AM station merged its programming with KMVP, the local ESPN Radio sports radio station. The merger was complete by January 1, 2007.

As KTAR-FM carried all news/talk programming, KTAR AM became "Arizona Sports 620". (On September 15, 2014, KTAR AM became "ESPN Phoenix 620 AM" with the local "Arizona Sports" format moving to 98.7 FM on January 6, 2014.) 860 AM was divested to the non-profit Cesar Chavez Foundation on March 9, 2017.

KKFR Programming

The former occupant of the 92.3 frequency, KKFR, went through several changes. Its intellectual property was acquired by Riviera Broadcast Group (which already owned 103.9 KEDJ and two stations in Las Vegas). Shortly thereafter, KKFR moved to 98.3 FM licensed to Mayer, which was KKLD in Prescott Valley.

Sunburst Media let Riviera operate and later own the station. KKFR took over KKLD and created the new KKFR on September 1.

HD radio
KTAR-FM broadcasts in the HD Radio hybrid format. The main signal airs KTAR's news/talk programming. The HD2 digital subchannel carries the Mormon Channel, aimed at members of the Church of Jesus Christ of Latter-day Saints, which owns Bonneville International. The Mormon Channel originates from Temple Square in Salt Lake City, and broadcasts religious and lifestyle shows 24 hours a day, seven days a week.

References

External links

TAR-FM
News and talk radio stations in the United States
Bonneville International
Radio stations established in 1970
1970 establishments in Arizona